(Henry) Guy Ellcock Pilgrim (Stepney, Barbados, December 24, 1875 – Upton, then in Berkshire, September 15, 1943) was a British geologist and palaeontologist.  He was a Fellow of the Royal Society and Superintendent of the Geological Survey of India, and made significant contributions to Cenozoic continental stratigraphy and vertebrate palaeontology.

Biography 
Pilgrim was born the son of Henry Ellcock Pilgrim and Beatrice Lucy Wrenford. After studies at the local Harrison College, he attended University College London where he received his Bachelor of Science in 1901 and Doctor of Science in 1908.  He was appointed to the Geological Survey of India in 1902 and promoted to superintendent in 1920, a post he held until his retirement in 1930.  He spent much of his retirement at the Department of Geology at the British Museum.

Pilgrim explored the geology of Arabia and Persia.  He was the first European to visit Trucial Oman and the first geologist to explore Bahrain Island where his discoveries lead to the present oil exploitations there.

Publications

References 

1875 births
1943 deaths
British palaeontologists
British geologists
Fellows of the Royal Society
People educated at Harrison College (Barbados)
Migrants from British Barbados to the United Kingdom